NGC 126 is a lenticular galaxy that was discovered on November 4, 1850 by Bindon Stoney, the very same day he discovered NGC 127 and NGC 130.

References

External links 
 

Lenticular galaxies
Astronomical objects discovered in 1850
0126
01784
Pisces (constellation)